The JCB Dieselmax is a diesel-engined 'streamliner' car designed for the purpose of breaking the land speed record for a diesel-engined vehicle.

The car was built for JCB, a British multinational equipment company.

Design
The car is powered by two specially-tuned versions of the production JCB444 powerplant, developing up to  each (over five times the power output of the production version with 90 psi (6 bar) of boost) and featuring four cylinders and 5 litres of displacement, accompanied by two stage turbochargers, intercooler and aftercooler. One of the dual engines drives the front wheels while the other drives the rear. Each engine is rev-limited to 3800 rpm.

As the size of the car prohibited meaningful wind tunnel testing, the streamlined shape of the car was refined entirely through the use of computational fluid dynamics by MIRA Ltd, which has enabled the car to obtain a very low coefficient of drag of only 0.147 and a CdA value (drag coefficient × frontal area) of only 0.129 m2. The fuel tank, which holds only 9 litres (2.38 U.S. gallons), is located directly behind the carbon fiber cockpit. The fully laden weight of the vehicle, including fuel, oil, ice, water coolant and the driver, is slightly less than 2,700 kg.

The chassis was designed and built by Coventry-based engineering company Visioneering for JCB, with engine development undertaken by Sussex-based Ricardo. The electrical system for the vehicle was supplied by R&D Vehicle Systems Ltd under contract to Visioneering. Ron Ayers led work on the aerodynamics, having previously worked on the ThrustSSC land speed record car.

During the 2006 Bonneville Speed Week and subsequent FIA record runs, the car was driven by Andy Green, a serving RAF Officer who previously broke, and still holds, the absolute land speed record with ThrustSSC.

Performance
The car began initial testing on 20 July 2006 on the runway at RAF Wittering with the lower-power  version of the JCB444 engine, the team slowly ramping up the speed to prove the chassis and engines. Two days later, the car was disassembled ready to be flown to Wendover Airport, Utah, on the 8th of August.

Before attaining these speeds, the Dieselmax was pushed from behind, by a JCB Fastrac, until it hit  where it engaged first gear.

Future
In a live interview from Utah on BBC News, Green said that the car was not running at its full potential, due to problems finding suitable tires and that this speed was achieved while the car was still in fifth gear (the car has six). He also reported that the vehicle traveled  on about a U.S. gallon (3.8 L) of fuel. The fuel tank holds just 9 L while the ice tank, used for cooling, holds 180 L.

In 2016 a ten-year anniversary celebration was held, where Lord Bamford expressed regret that the record had not been beaten and indicated that a fresh attempt could be made if the JCB record was broken. Although JCB have not made any official statements on the subject of a return to Bonneville, JCB Group Engineering Director Tim Leverton has hinted that they are currently studying the development of tires that would allow them to overcome the nominal  'safety limit' they had placed upon their current Goodyear units.

See also
List of vehicle speed records

References

External links 
JCB Dieselmax Official Website
BBC News, Dieselmax breaks diesel speed record
The engineering behind Dieselmax, Ingenia Magazine , September 2007
RDVS - Dieselmax electrical system supplier

Wheel-driven land speed record cars
JCB (company)
Streamliner cars